Craig Foster (born 1969) is an Australian former association footballer and current commentator and human rights advocate.

Craig Foster may also refer to:

Craig Foster (businessman), CEO of Clean Seas, an Australian seafood company
Craig Foster (filmmaker), plays himself in 2020 documentary film My Octopus Teacher
Craig Foster (Jamaican footballer) (born 1991), Jamaican footballer for Harrisburg City Islanders
Craig Foster, character in the 1967 film Here We Go Round the Mulberry Bush
Craig Foster, commander of VIP Protection Unit
Craig Foster, DC Comics character, see List of DC Comics characters: C